Josh Peppers (born May 23, 1985) is an American professional basketball player who plays for the Sendai 89ers of the B.League in Japan. He is going to get Japanese citizenship.

Career statistics 

|-
| align="left" |  2013-14
| align="left" | Iwate
| 52|| || 20.3|| .452|| .299|| .738|| 4.7|| 1.4|| 1.1|| 0.2|| 12.9 
|-
| align="left" |  2014-15
| align="left" | Fukuoka
| 52|| || 33.5|| .499|| .347|| .714|| 7.4|| 3.5|| 1.4|| 0.6|| 21.4 
|-
| align="left" |  2015-16
| align="left" | Fukuoka
| 40|| || 29.0|| .466|| .286|| .765|| 7.2|| 2.1|| 1.5|| 0.3||  16.6 
|-
|}

References

1985 births
Living people
Aisin AW Areions Anjo players
American expatriate basketball people in Japan
American men's basketball players
Basketball players from Memphis, Tennessee
Iwate Big Bulls players
Otsuka Corporation Koshigaya Alphas players
Power forwards (basketball)
Rizing Zephyr Fukuoka players
San-en NeoPhoenix players
Sendai 89ers players
Shiga Lakes players
Toyama Grouses players
UCF Knights men's basketball players